Joaquín García Monge (January 20, 1881 – January 1, 1958) is considered one of Costa Rica's most important writers.

He was born in Desamparados, Costa Rica in 1881 and was educated in both Costa Rica and Chile, where he fell under the influence of the leading literary currents of his time. He was the director of Costa Rica's Biblioteca Nacional from 1920 to 1936 and had considerable influence over the education system of the country during his lifetime. He was acknowledged as a leading contributor to the literary genre known as the cuadro de costumbre, following the innovations made by Manuel González Zeledón ("Magón"). He is most famous for his short novel El moto (1900). He died in 1958.

Bibliography
 El moto (novel, 1900)
 Hijas del campo (novel, 1900)
 Abnegación (novel, 1902)
 Ariel (story collection, 1905–1916)
 “La mala sombra y otros sucesos” (short story, 1917)

External links
 Biography

1881 births
1958 deaths
People from Desamparados (canton)
Costa Rican people of Spanish descent
Costa Rican male writers